Euro IV Ever is the fourth studio album by Swedish singer-songwriter E-Type, which was released in 2001. It contains hit songs "Life", "Africa" and "Campione 2000". That song was made as the official song of the 2000 UEFA European Football Championship.

Track listing

Notes
  signifies a co-producer

Charts

Weekly charts

Year-end charts

Certifications

References

E-Type (musician) albums
Albums produced by Max Martin
2001 albums
Albums produced by Rami Yacoub